Below are the results of the 2007 Biathlon World Championships 2007 for the men's relay, which took place on 7 February 2007.

Results

Did not start:
Sofia Domeij,  SWE
Saskia Santer,  BEL
Lenka Munclingerova,  CZE

Did not finish:
Kati Wilhelm,  GER

References 

Women's Individual
2007 in Italian women's sport